Nagbhushan Patnaik (27 November 1934 - 9 October 1998) was known as a communist revolutionary from Odisha. Born in a middle-class family to Ramamurty Patnaik and Rajalaxmi Patnaik in Padmapur on 27 November 1934, Nagbhushan later participated in the Naxalbari movement and remained in its front ranks to determine the future course of communist revolutionaries. He was one among the few founders of CPI(M-L) who remained active till the end of their lives.

Childhood

Patnaik spent his childhood days at Padmapur, Rayagada. He completed his primary education at Padmapur and then the family moved to Gunupur where his schooling continued in the Govt. Boys' High School, Gunupur. In one of his interviews at Gunupur, he revealed one interesting story about his childhood. During his childhood once it so happened that his father got a complaint about Nagbhushan beating some boy and so his father chased him to punish. Nagbhushan started running and managed to enter a temple, but his father closed the door. When Nagbhushan saw that there was no escape, he took a piece of brick in his hand to throw it at his father & warned him to face unwanted consequences, if he is caught. His father was very much annoyed, started laughing, took him to his back and surrendered before Lord Shiva. From that fearful day on wards the boy was known as Nagbhushan, which means "the Lord wearing snake".

The spirit of Naxalbari
At the age of 15, he joined the A.I.S.F. during his graduation at S.K.C.G. College of Paralakhemundi. Then he joined the BHU for his post graduation course. He was greatly influenced by the socialistic atmosphere at BHU. Very few people knew that Nagbhushan was a poet too. Najrul Islam was his inspiration. He knew well many languages like Oriya, Telugu, Bengali, but most of his writings are in English. Nagbhushan's poems of prisons   was released in Bhubaneswar on 26 August 2012. Nagbhushan was a practising lawyer at Gunupur. He met DBM Patnaik at Gunupur where both of them defended poor peasant cases.

Campaigning true Naxalism

When the Communist party was divided in 1964, Nagbhushan and his Comrades joined CPIM. In the beginning of the 60th decade he made several efforts for uniting the local adivasis of Malkangiri and the workers of Balimela area and geared up the movement in his own ways. He was arrested with other leaders in 1966 & was kept at Tihar Jail. In the jail he met the Telangana leader-Sundaraya. He discussed with him about his action plan of which Sunderaya became a great supporter.
When Ramamurthy, who was in charge of the trade union movement directed him to slow down the movement and to keep it within the democratic process, he could not accept the policy. He then geared up his armed-peasants movement and workers movement in his own way. With the change in the policies of CPIM, he started getting away from the party policies. The revolutionary communist party CPIML.(Marxist–Leninist)]]. was founded on 22 April 1969 & Nagbhushan was one of the founding leaders.
In 1966, he underwent a stomach operation which made him weak physically. In January 1969, he along with DBM Patnaik tried to mobilize the peasants in the villages in Gunupur area to fight their right, but Odisha police could get the information & swooped down upon Naxal hideouts. However Nagbhushan could manage to escape an arrest till 15 July 1969, when he was arrested along with 10 comrades. On 8 October 1969, he could manage to escape from Vishakhapatnam central jail with 10 others only to taste the freedom for a short period. He was again arrested and put behind bars & was subjected to inhuman tortures. He was sentenced to death by the Sessions court of Vishakhapatnam in the Parvatipuram conspiracy case(in which Nagbhushan Patnaik was one of the principal accused persons) in Dec 1970. The next year, the sentence was confirmed by Andhra Pradesh High Court. Nagbhushan refused to appeal for clemency.
He languished in jail even after Janata Dal came to power. After the emergency was over the civil liberties groups, all his admirers as well as intellectuals and political veterans like Dr. Harekrushna Mahatab, Jayaprakash Narayan & Sarvodays leader Malati Choudhury raised their voice for release of Nagbhushan Patnaik. 
He never moved a mercy petition, rather wrote a letter to the jail Suptd. asking him to comply with the orders and also to donate his body parts to the needy. At last their efforts compelled the Govt. to commute the death sentence to life sentence. It was only after a long and arduous legal battle that he was released in the middle of 1981 when he was almost on his death-bed. On release, the great leader moved to his residence at Gunupur. He was instrumental in the founding of Indian People's Front.

Death
After his release on parole, he spent his days mostly at Gunupur. Most of the time he remained busy with his profession. There he, with DBM Patnaik continued his profession as lawyer. Nagbhushan was instrumental in the historic judgment passed by the Hon'ble Supreme court of India, declaring section 309 of the India Penal Code as unconstitutional. Nagbhushan's strong moral stand gave him popularity across party lines. His lifelong mission to unify various revolutionary groups still remains a dream to be fulfilled. Nowadays some of the Naxal groups even forgot to stick to true naxalism and to respect the great leader. On 9 October 1998, Patnaik died in a private hospital at Chennai due to renal failure.

References

External links 
 "Advancing the Revolution with Great Sacrifices"

1934 births
1998 deaths
20th-century Indian lawyers
People from Rayagada district
Indian People's Front politicians